Louise Allen may refer to:

Louise Allen (novelist) (born 1949), British writer of romance novels
Louise Allen (tennis) (born 1962), American tennis player
Louise Allen (actress)  (ca. 1870–1909), American stage actress
Louise Allen (ca. 1840–1911), American stage actress better known as Mrs. J. H. Allen